Substance control may refer to:

Controlled Drug
Controlled substance
Controlled Substances Act
Drug prohibition law
Regulation of chemicals